Marphysa is a genus of annelids belonging to the family Eunicidae.

The genus has cosmopolitan distribution.

Species

Species:

Marphysa acicularum 
Marphysa aegypti 
Marphysa aenea

References

Annelids